The University of Southern Indiana (USI) is a public university just outside of Evansville, Indiana. Founded in 1965, USI enrolls 9,750 dual credit, undergraduate, graduate and doctoral students in more than 130 areas of study. USI offers programs through the College of Liberal Arts, Romain College of Business, College of Nursing and Health Professions and the Pott College of Science, Engineering, and Education. USI is a member of the American Association of State Colleges and Universities. It is also a Carnegie Foundation Community Engaged University which offers continuing education and special programs to more than 15,000 participants annually through outreach and engagement.

Beginning with the 2022-2023 school year, USI athletic teams will participate in Division I of the NCAA as a member of the Ohio Valley Conference. The teams are known as the Screaming Eagles. Previously, USI participated in Division II as a member of the Great Lakes Valley Conference. The university is home to an extensive student life, with more than 140 student organizations.

USI is classified among "M1 – Master's Colleges and Universities: Larger programs."

History

The University of Southern Indiana began as a regional campus of Indiana State University, opening on September 15, 1965. In 1967, Southern Indiana Higher Education, Inc., (SIHE) raised nearly $1 million to acquire 1,400 acres for the Mid-America University Center. Groundbreaking was held June 22, 1968. Since September 1969, the University has occupied 330 acres, mostly donated by SIHE. The first buildings constructed were the Science Center and the Wright Administration Building. Slowly the school built facilities, as funding became available during the Indiana State University-Evansville period.

On April 16, 1985, ISU-Evansville became an autonomous four-year institution, the University of Southern Indiana. Governor Robert D. Orr, an Evansville native, signed the newly independent school's charter. Since gaining its independence, USI's growth has continued to where it is now the fastest growing comprehensive university in the state. The university established student housing, diversified the programs offered, and enrollment has more than doubled since gaining its independence. In October 2006, the university completed a master plan that provides the framework to double the size of the school and support a campus of over 20,000 students. The master plan features key planning principles to guide the university and help it create a cohesive campus as it continues to grow.

Academics

Academic Units
USI offers over 70 undergraduate majors, 13 master's programs, and two doctoral programs as of the fall 2018 semester. Divisions of the University include the Romain College of Business, College of Liberal Arts, College of Nursing and Health Professions, Pott College of Science, Engineering, and Education, University Division, and Division of Outreach and Engagement. Each college is led by a dean who reports to the provost and vice president for Academic Affairs. USI employs 652 full-time faculty, lecturers, and academic administrators, and 239 part-time faculty.

The university is accredited by the Higher Learning Commission and carries several discipline-specific accreditations as well, including from the Association to Advance Collegiate Schools of Business, the Commission on Collegiate Nursing Education, and ABET.

The New Harmony Theatre
The New Harmony Theatre is a professional theatre operating in nearby New Harmony, Indiana under an agreement with Actors' Equity Association, the union of professional actors and stage managers in the United States. In fall 2007, USI Theatre partnered with The New Harmony Theatre on The Repertory Project, which allows top Theatre students to perform with Equity actors. Student actors and stage managers involved in The Repertory Project earn points toward joining the union, a membership that is considered the “gold standard” for theatre professionals.

Historic Southern Indiana
Historic Southern Indiana (HSI) is an outreach organization dedicated to preserving, enhancing, and promoting the abundant historical, natural, and recreational resources of southern Indiana. As a community outreach program of the University of Southern Indiana, HSI hosts workshops, produces publications, conducts visitor research, and facilitates and coordinates with many groups and agencies with the goal of creating a sense of regional identity and pride. The Heritage Area contains numerous sites of historical significance, including Vincennes, Corydon, New Harmony, Madison, and Abraham Lincoln's boyhood home. Forests, caves, rivers, and lakes offer scenic beauty and recreational activities.

Center for Communal Studies
The USI Center for Communal Studies is a clearinghouse for information, a research facility, and a sponsor of activities related to historic and contemporary intentional communities. The center encourages and facilitates meetings, classes, scholarships, publications, networking and public interest in communal groups past and present, here and abroad. The center archives contain primary and secondary materials on more than 100 historic communes and several hundred collective, cooperative, and co-housing communities founded since 1965. Noted communal scholars have donated their private collections and their extensive research notes and papers to the center archives.

Center for Applied Research
The Center for Applied Research (CAR) works with businesses and organizations throughout the region to conduct research, consulting, and other applied projects.

Southwest Indiana STEM (SwISTEM) Resource Center
The Southwest Indiana STEM Resource Center offers a free-equipment lending service to K-12 public, private, and parochial school educators as well as informal educators in a seventeen-county region in southwest Indiana. Teacher professional development as well as an extensive line-up of K-12 student outreach activities are offered throughout the calendar year.

Rankings
Online graduate degree nursing program was ranked 15th in the categories of Admissions Selectivity and Faculty Credentials and Training in the 2012 U.S. News & World Report rankings.
Students taking the Certified Management Accountant exam from the University of Southern Indiana had a pass rate of over 90% in 2018, one of only 4 schools nationally to cross this threshold.

Student life

Enrollment
Total USI enrollment is 11,033 for the 2017 fall semester, which includes students in undergraduate and graduate degree programs and 2,016 students enrolled in USI's College Achievement Program (CAP) classes in 27 high schools across Indiana. Students at USI represent 90 Indiana counties, 39 states and 70 countries. Out of state enrollment, including international students, makes up approximately 17% of the student population, and minority and international students comprise more than 14%.

More than 40,000 students have graduated since 1971. About 74% of USI's graduates remain in Indiana. The university serves an additional 16,000 persons annually through comprehensive noncredit programs of short duration.

Housing
Nearly all students who live on campus (with the exception of some freshmen who are housed in modern suite-style facilities) are assigned apartments with full kitchens. USI's four Residence Halls (Newman, Governor's, O'Bannon, and Ruston), located on the South side of campus, are freshmen-only modern suites. The apartments, located on the Northeastern side of campus, accommodate all other campus residents (including freshmen).

Greek life
Fraternities:
Tau Kappa Epsilon (Since 1970)
Sigma Tau Gamma (Since 1973-1999, re-chartered in 2013)
Lambda Chi Alpha (Since 1981)
Kappa Alpha Order (Since 2003)
Sigma Pi (Since 2007)
Alpha Phi Alpha (Since 2017)
Sororities:
Alpha Sigma Alpha (Since 1972)
Delta Zeta (Since 1975)
Gamma Phi Beta (Since 1998)
Alpha Sigma Tau (Since 2012)
Alpha Kappa Alpha (Since 2013)
Delta Sigma Theta (Since 1973, re-activated 2015)
Sigma Sigma Sigma (re-colonized 2015)
Gamma Phi Omega (since 2019)
Former Fraternities and Sororities:
Sigma Alpha Epsilon (1982-1984)
Alpha Sigma Phi (1994-2014, removed for low membership)
Phi Delta Theta (1986-2017, removed for hazing and alcohol violations)

Campus
USI's campus, located on 1400 acres (5.7 km2) of land west of Evansville, is accessed by University Parkway off of the Lloyd Expressway (IN-62). It is marked at the center by University Center East and West, which houses conference space, campus dining, offices and the campus store and by Reflection Lake to the west. The campus is connected to Burdette Park by the 3-mile, paved USI-Burdette Trail, and multiple lakeside and forest trails are available to the public through the Bent Twig Outdoor Education Center.

South of the University Center is the Quad, an open-air lawn flanked by David L. Rice Library (completed in 2006) and academic buildings for the College of Liberal Arts and Romain College of Business. Academic buildings for the College of Nursing and Health Professions and Pott College, as well as university administration and forum classrooms, are located north of University Center.

The total number of classrooms has more than doubled since the opening of the campus in 1967. Recent additions to the campus include the Business and Engineering Center (opened in 2010), the Applied Engineering Center (2013), the Performance Center (2014) and the Griffin Center (2016).

Athletics and Recreation
USI Basketball and Volleyball games are located in Screaming Eagles Arena, which opened on campus in 2019. Additionally, students have access to the Physical Activities Center, which also houses training facilities for student athletes. An aquatic center featuring a competition-length pool, as well as expansions and renovations to the Physical Activities Center, are currently under construction

Baseball, softball and soccer games all take place on campus. USI students and faculty also have access to the Recreation, Fitness and Wellness Center.

Historic New Harmony
In cooperation with the Indiana State Museum and Historic Sites, USI manages programs and properties in Historic New Harmony, site of two historic communal societies of the early 19th century, the Harmony Society and the Robert Owen/William Maclure communal experiment.

Media
USI is home to the Southern Indiana Review, a national literary journal. Stories published in the Southern Indiana Review have been anthologized in the Best American Short Stories and the Best American Essays.

The university contains within it three media outlets including the award-winning radio station, The Spin/WSWI, the student-run television station SETV12 Access UWSI, and the two-time "Division II Newspaper of the Year" student newspaper, The Shield. All programs are completely student-run entities within the campus that deal with student and community related topics and discussions.

Athletics

The athletic teams of USI are known as the Screaming Eagles. The university competes at the NCAA Division I level as members of the Ohio Valley Conference. USI sponsors 17 varsity intercollegiate sports. The school has won four NCAA national championships (men's basketball, 1995; baseball, 2010 and 2014; softball, 2018), finished three times as the national finalist (men's basketball, 1994 and 2004; and women's basketball 1997), and earned two third-place finishes (men's cross country, 1982; baseball, 2007). The men's and women's cross country/track teams have produced five individual national championships since 1997.

The NCAA II Softball National Championship in 2018 marked the first softball team in Indiana to win an NCAA championship. The national championship in baseball in 2010 marked the first GLVC member and university in the state of Indiana to win such a title, repeating in 2014 to become the first NCAA II program to win multiple team titles. The men's basketball NCAA II National Championship in 1995 garnered 3.9 million viewers watching them on CBS Sports.

On February 7, 2022, the university's board of trustees unanimously approved the athletics program to seek membership at the NCAA Division I level. On February 9, USI announced that it had accept an offer to become a member of the Ohio Valley Conference beginning on July 1, 2022.

USI boasts a strong academic record as well, with 228 Academic All-GLVC athletes in 2021-22 and 35 Academic All-America honors. Student athletes maintain an average GPA of 3.29 and are retained at a high percentage.

Men's sports
Baseball
Basketball
Cross country
Golf
Soccer
Tennis
Track and field

Women's sports
Basketball
Cross country
Golf
Soccer
Softball
Tennis
Track and field
Volleyball

Notable alumni
Kevin Brown, professional baseball player. Played from 1996 to 2002 with the Blue Jays, Brewers, Rangers and Red Sox.
Dale Carter, inducted into the Country Radio Hall of Fame 2011.
Brad Ellsworth (Democrat), former member of the United States House of Representatives in the 110th Congress, Indiana's 8th congressional district and former Sheriff of Vanderburgh County, Indiana.
Stan Gouard, basketball player and current USI coach.
Darin Mastroianni, professional baseball player for the Minnesota Twins. Drafted in 16th round of the 2007 MLB Player Draft by the Toronto Blue Jays.
Zach Payne, member of the Indiana House of Representatives
Vince Russo, former booker for WCW and WWF; former booker for Total Nonstop Action Wrestling; briefly held WCW's World Heavyweight Championship. Runs a well known professional wrestling podcast.
Jeff Schulz, professional baseball player. Played for the Kansas City Royals and the Pittsburgh Pirates in 1989.
Jamar Smith, professional basketball player. Signed by the Boston Celtics and assigned to the Maine Red Claws.
Robert Titzer, author and inventor of the book series Your Baby Can Read.
Duncan Bray, Shetland national football team player
Falen Bonsett, Co-Host of the Dave Ryan in the Morning Show on KDWB 101.3 in Minneapolis, MN

References

External links

Official athletics website
The Shield University of Southern Indiana Student Newspaper

 
Education in Vanderburgh County, Indiana
Buildings and structures in Vanderburgh County, Indiana
Southwestern Indiana
University of Southen Indiana
Educational institutions established in 1965
Sports in Evansville, Indiana
Tourist attractions in Vanderburgh County, Indiana
1965 establishments in Indiana
Universities and colleges accredited by the Higher Learning Commission